Word Broadcasting Corporation (also known as Filipinas Broadcasting Association, Inc.) is a Philippine radio network. Its corporate office is located at University of San Carlos, Downtown Campus, Corner. P. del Rosario St. Cebu City.

Originally founded by the local division of the Congregation of the Most Holy Redeemer, it is operated by the Society of the Divine Word's Philippine Southern Province division since 1979. It is currently an affiliate of Catholic Media Network.

Stations

AM Stations

FM Stations

References

Philippine radio networks
Catholic radio stations
Radio stations established in 1968